A SWAT vehicle, police armored vehicle, or police rescue vehicle is a non-military armored vehicle used by police tactical units to respond to incidents. They are most often in configurations similar to military light utility vehicles, infantry mobility vehicles, or armoured personnel carriers. They are generally designed to have armor that can sufficiently block high-caliber rounds, space to carry the unit's equipment, and sufficient passenger seating; some also allow for additional personnel to hang onto the side of the vehicle in transit.

Production 

A SWAT vehicle may simply be an unarmored van, SUV or truck used to transport equipment or officers or used as a command post. Other more specialized vehicles may be armoured personnel carriers to allow them to be in situations where armed confrontation is likely. Early versions of the SWAT vehicles were based on production vans such as the International Harvester Metro Vans.

Specialized heavy-duty commercial vehicles can be up-fitted and built solely as SWAT Vehicles, such as the Ballistic Armored Tactical Transport from The Armored Group, LLC; Mesa, Arizona currently operates one of these vehicles. The Lenco BearCat is another of these such vehicles built upon a commercial Ford F550 chassis. Lenco BearCats are currently used by various agencies in North America and worldwide.

Ambulances and armored trucks can also be converted into SWAT vans or trucks. De-militarized armored personnel carriers can be used for this purpose, as is the case with the Phoenix Police Department which uses an M113 as part of its inventory, or the Florida Highway Patrol which has three Cadillac Gage Commandos.

By country

France 

Among other armoured vehicles, the SWAT units of the French National Police RAID and Research and Intervention Brigade (BRI) are equipped with different armoured vans.

Germany 
Armoured police vehicles were first introduced after World War I by German police forces, who had more than hundred armoured vehicles called  (German for special automobile). Nowadays the Federal Police and the state police forces still maintain armoured vans, like Sonderwagen 4 and Sonderwagen 5. The federal police recently also ordered the LAPV Enok in addition to its Mowag Eagle and ATF Dingo. The SEK special state police units use armored vehicles like the LAPV Enok and the Survivor R.

Japan 

More heavily-armored vehicles called  were introduced in the 1960s. The first deployed model was called Type F-3, based on Mitsubishi's cab-after-engine trucks. They were initially treated as idlers because there are only few reports of gun violence in Japan, but they were highly appreciated during the Asama-Sansō incident in 1972 and their significance were widely recognized.

After several model changes, Type PV-2 based on the Mitsubishi Fuso Canter is now deployed nationwide, mainly for Anti-firearms squads. There are also simplified version called , and much larger ; the latter is dedicated to the Special Assault Teams.

United Kingdom 

Police in the United Kingdom, particularly the Police Service of Northern Ireland (PSNI), has a great number of police role armoured vehicles based upon a range of base platforms including the Land Rover Defender and the OVIK Crossway. The internal security situation in Northern Ireland demands that the police operate up to 450 armoured vehicles which are optimised for public order duties.  The PSNI uses OVIK Pangolin armoured public order vehicles.

United States 
SWAT units may also employ ARVs (Armored Rescue Vehicle) for insertion, maneuvering, or during tactical operations such as the rescue of civilians, officers, firefighters, and/or military personnel pinned down by gunfire. To avoid detection by suspects during insertion in urban environments, SWAT units may also use modified buses, vans, trucks, or other seemingly normal vehicles. During the 1997 North Hollywood shootout, LAPD SWAT commandeered an armored cash-delivery truck, which they used to extract wounded civilians and officers from the raging firefight with the heavily armed bank robbers.

See also
Internal security vehicle
FBI Special Weapons and Tactics Teams

References

Police vehicles
Paramilitary vehicles
Vans